Erasmus Darwin Hall (April 12, 1812October 2, 1878) was an American merchant from Wisconsin, who served in the 1st Wisconsin Legislature as a Whig, representing Winnebago County in the Wisconsin State Assembly.

Biography

Hall was a native of Vermont, and came to Wisconsin Territory in 1838. Hall and his wife became among the earliest settlers of the Waukau area, arriving there in 1845 along with other members of Hall's extended family (John M., J. R. and Uriah Hall), and accompanied by their son Darwin Hall. He engaged in "mercantile pursuits".

Hall held various public offices, including being elected the first chairman of the newly organized Town of Rushford, Wisconsin and a frequent member of the county's board of supervisors (1847, 1850, 1853, 1855). In 1848, he was elected as a Whig to the single Assembly seat allocated to Winnebago County. He was succeeded in 1849 by fellow Whig Thomas J. Townsend. In 1856, the Halls moved to Grand Rapids in Wood County, Wisconsin; and later to Milwaukee, where they stayed about five years.

In 1870, the Halls (including a son) moved to Mississippi, intending to plant cotton. After one season, they laid plans to return to Wisconsin, but Hall was offered the position of postmaster of Okolona, Mississippi. Due to health problems, he later moved to Ocean Springs, Mississippi, where in 1878 both of the Halls succumbed to yellow fever. Darwin Hall had already moved to Minnesota, and served in the Minnesota House of Representatives by this time; but his service in the Minnesota Senate and United States House of Representatives took place after their deaths.

References

External links

|-

1812 births
1878 deaths
Mississippi postmasters
Businesspeople from Wisconsin
County supervisors in Wisconsin
Mayors of places in Wisconsin
Members of the Wisconsin State Assembly
People from Waukau, Wisconsin
Wisconsin Whigs
19th-century American politicians
People from Ocean Springs, Mississippi
People from Okolona, Mississippi
Mississippi Republicans
People from Grand Rapids, Wisconsin
Deaths from yellow fever
19th-century American businesspeople